5Q or 5-Q may refer to:

5Q, IATA code for Holiday Europe
5Q, former IATA code for Best Air
5Q, former IATA code for Euroceltic Airways
5q, an arm of Chromosome 5 (human)
Chromosome 5q deletion syndrome 
5q- syndrome; see  Myelodysplastic syndrome
AD-5Q, a model of  Douglas A-1 Skyraider
5Q, designation for one of the Qumran Caves
MD 5Q, a section of  Maryland Route 5
5Q, the production code for the 1980 Doctor Who serial Meglos

See also
Q5 (disambiguation)